Wild Wild West is the second album by rock band The Escape Club, released in 1988. It includes their most well-known song, "Wild, Wild West".  The album also included the singles "Shake for the Sheik" and "Walking Through Walls".

Track listing
All songs written and arranged by The Escape Club.

Charts

Weekly charts

Year-end charts

Personnel

The Escape Club
Trevor Steel:  Guitars, Main Vocal
John Holliday: Guitars, Harmonica, Backing Vocals
Johnnie Christo: Bass, Backing Vocals
Milan Zekavica: Drums, Percussion

Additional Personnel
Steve Pigott, John Carin, Alan Clark: Keyboards, Synthesizers
Andy Duncan, Steve Scales: Percussion
Ben Parks, Brian Brumitt, Dave Plews, Jim Patterson: Horns
"Plum", Tessa Niles: Backing Vocals

References 

1988 albums
The Escape Club albums
Albums produced by Chris Kimsey
Atlantic Records albums